Alfredo De Vido is an architect and author in New York City. He is known for his residential projects. His work also includes the 1993 renovation of the Queens Theatre in the Park.

Musician Mitch Miller hired him for the Green Briar development in the town of Somers, New York. De Vido's design work was part of the Weekend Utopia: The Modern Beach House on Eastern Long Island, 1960-1973, exhibition at Guild Hall in East Hampton. The book Alfredo De Vido (Ten Houses) by Michael J. Crosbie, Richard J. Wertheimer highlights some of his residential work.

De Vido was the architect for the renovation of the circular Theaterama at Queens Theatre in Park, originally part of Philip Johnson's construction project for the 1964 World's Fair. The theatre was once decorated with the artworks including those of Andy Warhol and Robert Indiana. The circular theater was converted according to De Vido's plans into the 476-seat Queens Theater in the Park, a wonderful success according to Borough President Claire Shulman of Queens, who said she was an attendee at the 1939 World's Fair (held at the same site) as a little girl.

De Vido's addition of four floors to the Brinckerhoff Carriage House in 1992, a victorian architecture building, was somewhat controversial for destroying the mansard roof. The work was done for the Allen-Stevenson School.

Projects
Green Briar, a 237 home development in the town of Somers, New York, in Westchester
House in Delhi, New York
 54 Willow Street (design), a four-story residence 
 Sametz House in Garrison, New York
 Solar House Plan #3
Community Church of Astoria addition, with David Cook
Silver Sands Park renovation plan
Minton House (1990)
Wirth House (1975)
Aksen House (1978/1979) Stamford, CT (11)
Matthews House (East Hampton) (1967), East Hampton
Duffy House, Wainscott New York (1991)
De Vido House (1997), Easthampton
Ross House (Easthampton) (1961), Easthampton  for Hal Ross
3 White Pine Road (1986), Easthampton
Ferguson House (Pound Ridge) (1983), Pound Ridge
Boyle House (1982), Bernardsville, New Jersey
David Allan House (1992), Saddle River, New Jersey
Jonathan's Landing design (1985) Brooklyn, New York
Haldinger House (1973) Winhall, Vermont
Rafferty House (1973)
Columbia County House (1978)
Megerle House (1978) North Castle, New York, for Karl Mergerle

Publications
Alfredo De Vido: Selected and Current Works by Alfredo De Vido, Stephen Dobney Images Publishing, 1998 – 256 pages 
A collection of residential projects that is part of the 'Master Architect Series'.
 Alfredo De Vido: Designing Your Client's House: An Architect's Guide to Meeting Design Goals and Budgets, Watson-Guptill, 1990 – 208 pages
 Alfredo De Vido: Innovative Management Techniques: For Architectural Design and Construction, Whitney Library of Design, 1984 – 207 pages
Features 45 richly illustrated, well-researched case studies of houses, stores, and public buildings, each chosen to provide a valuable example of skillful management. 
 Alfredo De Vido: House Design : Art and Practice, John Wiley & Sons, Inc., 1996 – 256 pages
House Design: Art and Practice is a step-by-step overview of all the nuts-and-bolts, human factors, and numerous intangibles that must be successfully orchestrated to produce a good house.
 Alfredo De Vido: Ten Houses, Rockport Publishers, 1998 – 108 pages
The Ten Houses series makes the most important elements of architectural design available to a large and varied audience. Each infinitely useful volume presents one of the world's foremost architects and features 10 of his or her finest residential works-including presentation, drawings, sketches, and working drawings.

References

Living people
Architects from New York City
Year of birth missing (living people)